Clinidium integrum is a species of ground beetle in the subfamily Rhysodinae. It was described by Antoine Henri Grouvelle in 1903. It is known from its type locality in western Amazonas state, Brazil, and from Leticia in Amazonas Department, Colombia.

Clinidium integrum measures  in length.

References

Clinidium
Beetles of South America
Insects of Brazil
Arthropods of Colombia
Beetles described in 1903